Naishadha Charita, also known as Naishadhiya Charita, is a poem in Sanskrit on the life of Nala, the king of Nishadha. Written by Sriharsha, it is considered one of the five mahakavyas (great epic poems) in the canon of Sanskrit literature. It was composed by Śrī Harṣa in the court of Gahaḍavāla King Jayachandra.

Contents 
Naishadha Charita presents the story of Nala's early life; his falling in love with Damayanti, their marriage, and honeymoon.

This  mahakavya  is divided into two parts – Purva and Uttara, each of them containing eleven cantos or divisions. Its story is that of Nala and Damayanti, the daughter of Bhima, the king of Vidarbha. This story is first related in the 3rd part of Vanaparva of the Mahabharata, where the treatment is different. The language of the Naishadha Charita is highly elaborate and polished, with continual play upon words and variety of metres. Shishupala Vadha of Magha and Naishadha Charita of Sriharsha are considered tests for scholars; of the Naishadha it is said that Naishadham Vidvad-aushadham, that it is the "Scholars’ tonic".

Characters
The main characters of the poem are:
 Nalaking of Naishadha
 DamayantiNala's beloved, and later his wife
 Saraswatigoddess of learning
 Indraking of heaven
 Gods as suitors to Damayanti

Plot

The first canto begins with an elaborate description of Nala, his physical beauty, valour and other qualities. The minstrels visiting the court of Nala bring the news of Damayanti, the daughter of King Bhimna, as an accomplished and charming lady. Love for that princess was thus kindled in Nala. Unable to bear it, he went to a pleasure garden in his palace where seize a beautiful he saw swan. It cried in horror and was let off by the kind prince. It went to Kundinapura, the capital city of King Bhima, and managed to find Damayanti in a garden there. The swan gave her a good picture of Nala and assured her of its services in fostering mutual affection between her and Nala. It flew to Nala and apprised him of Damayanti's enviable attainments. King Bhima was informed of his daughter's ailment, which was virtually love-sickness, by the innocent and inexperienced companions of Damayanti. Thereupon, Bhima, made arrangements for the swayamvara (an ancient Indian practice whereby a girl chooses a husband from a list of suitors) of his daughter.

Meanwhile, Indra, the king of the gods, learnt from Narada the news of Damayanti's swayamvara and of her steadfast love for Nala. Natural fascination to win the hand of a damsel goaded Indra to attend the swayamvara. He got down to earth with gods Agni, Yama, Varuna and Shani (Saturn) and met on his way Nala, who too was proceeding to attend the swayamvara. He was unable to contain his envy on noticing Nala's enchanting appearance and so resorted to a ruse by requesting Nala to be the emissary of the gods and impress upon Damayanti of their unequalled worthiness. The rewards that are vouchsafed traditionally to one who offers his service to another in need were brought by Indra to the notice of Nala, who was otherwise unwilling and at the same time felt the delicacy of refusing the request of the divine beings. At last, he agreed and was sent to the harem of Damayanti, remaining invisible to others — a boon granted to him by the gods.

Keeping his identity unknown to Damayanti, Nala attempted to deliver to her the message of the gods but his well-reasoned arguments on behalf of the gods were not acceptable to Damayanti, who was against a human being seeking an alliance with the gods. Nala's warning that the gods would create problems and obstacles in her married life, if she chose some one else, did not defer her from her steadfast love for Nala. At last, Nala revealed his identity and left the harem.

The four gods assumed a form that was identical to Nala's and were there along with Nala, virtually presenting five Nalas. At the instance of Vishnu, Saraswati, the goddess of learning, became the bridesmaid for Damayanti. She took the princess to the kings and spoke highly of the worth of each one, but they were all rejected by Damayanti. At last, the princess was brought before the five Nalas. Sarasvati described each god in such a manner that her words attributable to that god were also contained in her description. Damayanti was perplexed. She felt that Nala was a master of many lores and could understand even the intentions of horses and so he was there presenting himself in five forms. She was unable to know the real Nala and in a mood of anguish prayed to the gods to reveal their identity and enable her to choose Nala. She found that the gods did not touch the ground with their feet, did not wink and had no sweat on their bodies. Their garlands did not fade. Thus she became certain about their identity.

On knowing Nala's identity, bashfulness took full control of her. She would put the garland around Nala's neck but her fingers did not move even a little to do so, restraint and bashfulness forbidding her. She whispered into the ears of Saraswati uttering the letter  (lit. no) and stopped. She touched the fingers of Saraswati who laughed at this. The bridesmaid took the princess before Nala and addressed the gods that Damayanti, a chaste woman, would not choose any of them and requested them to shower their favour on the princess. The gods gave their assent through the movement of their eyebrows and returned to their regions. The marriage celebrations followed on a grand scale.

Kali, the evil genius, met the gods who were returning to their regions, and was informed of Damayanti's choice. He avowed to spoil the happy life of the wedded pair and took his position on a tree in Nala's mansion.

The last five cantos deal with the happy life of Nala and Damayanti. The poet takes care to show that Nala did not violate the rules of conduct in his religious acts. The poem abruptly ends after narrating Damayanti's beauty in the moonlit night.

Events occurring in each chapter

The progress of the story spanning across 22 chapters is presented below, by showing the significant events covered in a range of verses. The verse numbers referred to here are taken from the book Naishadhiya Charitam Of Harsha published by Nirnaya Sagar Press.

Sarga 1

Sarga 2

Sarga 3

Sarga 4

Sarga 5

Sarga 6

Sarga 7

Sarga 8

Sarga 9

Sarga 10

Sarga 11

Sarga 12

Sarga 13

Sarga 14

Sarga 15

Sarga 16

Sarga 17

Sarga 18

Sarga 19

Sarga 20

Sarga 21

Sarga 22

Date and authorship 
Sriharsa flourished during the 12th century A.D. He lived during the reign of Jayachandra of Kanauj who was defeated by Shihabuddin in 1193 A.D.

Translations
Naishadha Charita was translated into Telugu by the 15th-century Telugu poet Srinatha. It was translated into English by Krishna Kanta Handique, and into Hindi by Guman Mishra and Rishinatha Bhatta.

References

External links
Naishadha-charita English translation (searchable and includes glossary)
  (English translation)

Sanskrit poetry
Epic poems in Sanskrit
12th-century Indian books
Poems based on the Mahabharata